The 1994 NHK Trophy was held at the Morioka Ice Arena in Morioka on December 8–11. Medals were awarded in the disciplines of men's singles, ladies' singles, pair skating, and ice dancing.

Results

Men

Ladies

Pairs

Ice dancing

External links
 1994 NHK Trophy

Nhk Trophy, 1994
NHK Trophy